Aranlah (also Romanized as Ārānlah; also known as Azānlah) is a village in Bavaleh Rural District, in the Central District of Sonqor County, Kermanshah Province, Iran. At the 2006 census, its population was 259, in 56 families.

References 

Populated places in Sonqor County